George William Oghani (born 2 September 1960) is an English former footballer.

Career
Born in Manchester, England, he played for Sheffield United, Bury, Hyde United, Bolton Wanderers (where he became the first black person to play for their first team), Wrexham, Burnley, Stockport County, Hereford United, Hyde United for a second time where he scored 78 goals in 145 appearances, Scarborough, AEP Paphos FC and Carlisle United.

References

External links
Player stats at Hyde United
Player info at ClaretsMad.co.uk

1960 births
Living people
Footballers from Manchester
English footballers
Association football forwards
Sheffield United F.C. players
Bury F.C. players
Hyde United F.C. players
Bolton Wanderers F.C. players
Wrexham A.F.C. players
Burnley F.C. players
Stockport County F.C. players
Hereford United F.C. players
Scarborough F.C. players
Carlisle United F.C. players
AEP Paphos FC players
Guiseley A.F.C. players
Northwich Victoria F.C. players
National League (English football) players
Expatriate footballers in Cyprus
English Football League players
Cypriot First Division players